Alfredo Battistini (8 August 1953, in Uznach, Switzerland – 17 May 2008, in St. Gallenkappel, Switzerland) was an Italian-Swiss sculptor, illustrator, and athlete.

Life 

Alfredo Battistini was born in Uznach, Switzerland on 8 August 1953. His parents Alearda di Traglia and Alfredo Battistini originated from San Piero in Bagno and Sarsina in the Romagna, Italy.

On 26 December 1971 he boxed in the support fight to Muhammad Ali’s match with Juergen Blin at the Hallenstadion in Zurich. He became Swiss Light Heavyweight Boxing Champion in 1976. As a disabled athlete he later won five World Championships, two European Championships and twenty five Swiss weightlifting titles.  He won three bronze medals at 1988 Summer Paralympics in Seoul and 1992 Summer Paralympics in Barcelona. He won gold and silver medals at the World Championships in Stoke Mandeville, England and Sydney, Australia. His record performance was a lift of two hundred and twenty kilos.

His first apprenticeship was as a bricklayer.  In 1976 he moved to Paris to work as an assistant to the fashion photographer Lothar Schmid.  He also completed a qualification as a stonemason in Rapperswil, his Swiss hometown.  He also took an apprenticeship as a sports masseur to study human anatomy.  He went on to work for Hans Joerg Limbach, studying as the distinguished sculptor's sole student.

In 1979, he won a place at the Art Academy in Paris. On 27 May of that year, he was paralyzed in a car accident and was restricted to a wheel chair thereafter. He overcame this setback to devote himself to his art and sport, the later an important part of his rehabilitation. A philanthropist with a strong sense of justice for the weak and disadvantaged, in 2004 he received an award for his achievements at The Paraplegic Centre in Switzerland as Paraplegic of the Year.

His love and passion was art and sculpting. He began his early works after a year long study trip through Chile including visits to the Art College in Santiago. In 1983, with the support of Guido A. Zaech, he presented his first exhibition in Bottmingen near Basle. Those works show the inspiration he derived from both Hans Joerg Limbach and Auguste Rodin, and above all the master, Michelangelo himself.  His sculptures and choice of material, bronze and marble, reveal his iron will coupled with both sensitivity and vulnerability. His achievement is recognised by many public and sporting works including a piece in honour of the Circus Knie at the entrance to Rapperswil or the trophy for the Stuttgart Open Tennis Championship which was received by Boris Becker, Stefan Edberg, Thomas Muster and Petr Korda.
Alfredo Battistini died unexpectedly on 17 March 2008 due to heart failure in his home town St. Gallenkappel at the peak of his career. He was only 54 years old.

Museum 
In 2009 Alfredo Battistini's sculpture "La Creazione", an homage to Michelangelo's creation of Adam in the Sistine Chapel in Rome, was installed in the "Museo Michelangiolesco". This museum is located next to the master's birthplace in the town of Caprese Michelangelo, Tuscany. Michelangelo Buonarroti was born there on 6 March 1475.

Athletic achievements

Boxing 
 1971
 Support fight „Muhammed Ali versus Jürgen Blin“
 1975
 Swiss Champion in light heavyweight
 1976
 Swiss Champion in light heavyweight

Pentathlon 
 1981
 Swiss Champion

Weight lifting, wheel chair athletics 
 1982
 World Light Heavyweight Champion and Swiss Champion
 9th Swiss Wheelchair Championship in Biel
 1983
 Vice Light Heavyweight Champion and Swiss champion
 10th Swiss Wheelchair Championship in Thun
 1984
 Swiss Light Heavyweight Champion
 11th Swiss Wheelchair Championship in Zurich
 7th World Wheelchair Games, Paralympics Stoke Mandeville UK, bronze medal (category +95 kg, 195 kg)
 1st National Wheelchair Sport Meeting in Grosshoechstetten. Gold Medalist
 1985
 World Light Heavyweight Champion (first lift in wheelchair exceeding 200 kg)
 8th World Wheelchair Games, Paralympics Stoke Mandeville UK. Gold Medalist
 Swiss Champion at bench press (included able bodied athletes)
 1986
 World, European and Swiss Light Heavyweight Champion in Kriens & Thun
 Swiss Champion at bench press (included able bodied athletes)
 1987
 World and Swiss Light Heavyweight Champion
 Swiss champion at bench press (included able bodied athletes)
 International Stoke Mandeville Games.  Gold Medalist
 14th Swiss Wheelchair Championship in Freiburg
 2nd Champion at Swiss Dev. Gouche Seniors
 1988
 World Light Heavyweight Champion
 Seoul Paralympics power lifting, (category +95 kg, 187.5 kg) Bronze Medalist
 1992
 Swiss Champion.  Bench Press 200, 220 kg
 19th Swiss Wheelchair Championship in Zug
 Barcelona Paralympics power lifting (category +100 kg, 190 kg) Bronze Medalist
 World Champion and World Record at the 17th National Wheelchair Games in Adelaide, Australia lifting 220 kg
 1993
 Gold medal at the world wheel power games Stoke Mandeville, weight lifting, power lifting and combination
 Swiss Champion in bench press 220 kg
 ISMWSF Games Gold
 1994
 Swiss Champion and Swiss record (12 times improved) at bench press
 1995
 2nd Swiss Arm Wrestling Cup in St. Gallen. Record holder for bench press
 1996
 Swiss Champion class and overall for bench press in Bremgarten (Swiss record of 220 kg)
 1998
 Vice Swiss Champion at bench press in Bremgarten (210 kg)
 Swiss Championship in wheelchair sports, Rapperswil
 2000
 Swiss Champion at bench press in Bremgarten (category +100 kg, 210 kg)

Key sculptures 

 1982
 Laura
 Inspiration
 1985
Ueberdosis Menschheit
 1992
 C’est la vie
 Male torso
 1993
 Memorial to Circus Knie in Rapperswil – White Clown
 Trophy for Eurocard Open in Stuttgart
 1994
 Spirale zum Erfolg
 Tomb Daniela Jutzeler
 Tomb for unnamed
 1995
 La Creazione (the creation)
 1997
 La Luce (small)
 Waerme des Lebens
 Sempre Donne
 Mondo Elefanti – memorial for Rolf Knie
 Champion – Trophy for Andy Hug
 2002
 La Luce (large)
 Gil, dedication to Gil Rossellini
 2003
 Engel der Liebe
 2006
 Faust /Kraft
 Politiker sind Moerder
 2007
 Il Tempo, marble
 Glut, marble carrara
 undated
 Geborgenheit
 Insieme
 Per sempre (bronze and marble)
 Sempre Donne (bronze and marble)

Movies 

 2006
 Kill Gil Volume 2-story of Gil Rossellini starring Gil Rossellini

External links 
 Alfredo Battistini
 Museo Michelangiolesco
 

1953 births
2008 deaths
People from Rapperswil-Jona
Medalists at the 1988 Summer Paralympics
Medalists at the 1992 Summer Paralympics
Weightlifters at the 1988 Summer Paralympics
Weightlifters at the 1992 Summer Paralympics
Paralympic weightlifters of Switzerland
Swiss male boxers
20th-century Swiss sculptors
20th-century Swiss male artists
Paralympic bronze medalists for Switzerland
Paralympic medalists in powerlifting
Sportspeople from the canton of St. Gallen